No Risk, No Gain is 1990 Hong Kong comedy film directed by Jimmy Heung and Taylor Wong and starring Alan Tam, Andy Lau and Natalis Chan. It is the second installment of the Casino Raiders series.

Plot
Cheung San-ho forces Ray to Macau to compete with him in gambling and has Ray to go to Macau to wait for his arrival. Coming back from the United States to Hong Kong in search of his cousin, he was swindled by con artists Big Dee and Leslie Mo, whom take his gambling stake and VIP card (an identification given from Cheung to Ray). The two counterfeit Ray's supreme identity (Leslie acts as Ray while Big Dee acts as his bodyguard) to Macau for gambling. Not long later, Ray catches up and catches them, but decided to let Leslie to impersonate him. Unexpectedly, Yeung Sing and Yeung Chun has evil intentions, planning to murder the three of them, and then frame Cheung. When Yeung Sing brings his three henchmen to kill them, Yeung Chun and Cheung arrives and Chun kills Sing. Cheung apologises to Ray for this incident, while Ray suggests Big Dee and Leslie to take part in the gambling competition, which Cheung agrees. During the final round of the competition, due to Cheung and Ray's rivalry for snipe and the clam, it allows Big Dee to get all the spoils of a small card to become the big winner. But after the game, Yeung Chun reveals his true self: he wanted to takes his boss Cheung's spot and hires Big Fool to kill him, but Big Fool did not listen to Chun because he is actually Ray's longtime friend. In the end, Yeung Chun gets his punishment. After that, Ray returns to the United States while Big Dee makes a deal with him that in a year later, he will truly beat Ray again at the gambling table.

Cast
Alan Tam as Ray
Andy Lau as Big Dee
Natalis Chan as Leslie Mau / Snake
Chen Sung-young as Cheung San-ho
Michelle Reis as Winnie 
May Lo as Jane Tsang
Christine Ng as Maureen
Shing Fui-On as Big Fool
Anthony Wong as Yeung Sing
Cutie Mui as Sexy (cameo)
Tien Feng as Yeung Chun
Gan Tat-wah as Western Boy
Benz Kong as Trick gambler in jail
San Kuai as one of Sing's men
Paul Wong as one of Sing's men
Ho Kwok-wah as one of Sing's men
Chow Chi-hung as one of Sing's men
Ridley Tsui as one of Sing's men
Lee Hang as one of Sing's men
Wan Seung-lam as one of Sing's men
Kong Lung as Sing's bodyguard
So Wai-nam as Gangster after Leslie
Gan Seung-yuk as Gambler at Gambling competition
Law Shu-kei as Gambling competition's emcee
Chang Seng-kwong as Fake cop
Ernest Mauser as Spectator at gambling competition
Fung Man-kwong as one of Ho's men

Theme song
"Warm-Blooded Man" (熱血男兒)
Composer: Siu Fung
Lyricist: Keith Chan Siu-kei
Singer: Andy Lau

Box office
The film grossed HK$19,078,746 at the Hong Kong box office during its theatrical run from 5 April to 26 April 1990 in Hong Kong

External links

No Risk, No Gain at Hong Kong Cinemagic

1990 films
Hong Kong adventure comedy films
Films about gambling
1990s adventure comedy films
1990s Cantonese-language films
Films set in Hong Kong
Films set in the United States
Films set in Macau
Films shot in Hong Kong
Films directed by Taylor Wong
1990 comedy films
1990s Hong Kong films